A gubernatorial election was held on 2 July 2006 to elect the next governor of , a prefecture of Japan located in the Kansai region of Honshu island.

Candidates  

Yoshitsugu Kunimatsu, 68, incumbent since 1998, former prefectural official in charge of general affairs and health and welfare matters. He was supported by the LDP, New Komeito, as well as the opposition DPJ.
Yoshinori Tsuji, 59, labor union leader, endorsed by JCP. 
Yukiko Kada, 56, Kyoto Seika University Professor. She was backed by the SDP.

Results

References 

2006 elections in Japan
Shiga gubernational elections
Politics of Shiga Prefecture
July 2006 events in Japan